Dumbleyung Lake, also widely known as Lake Dumbleyung, is a salt lake in the Great Southern region of Western Australia.

Description
The traditional owners of the area are the Noongar peoples. The lake is part of a dreaming trail that extends from the south coast near Augusta to the Great Victoria Desert country to the north east. Other features along the trail include Mulka's Cave, Wave Rock, Jilakin Rock, Jitarning Rock and Puntapin Rock.

The explorers Henry Landor and Henry Maxwell Lefroy are usually credited with the discovery of Dumbleyung Lake, although it appears to have been shown on a map in 1839 with the name Kondening Lake.  Grazing leases around the lake were first granted to George Kersley in 1875.

Dumbleyung Lake received world recognition when Donald Campbell broke the world water speed record on it on 31 December 1964, travelling at 444.66 km/h (276.3 mph) in his boat Bluebird K7.  A granite memorial to Campbell can be seen at Pussy Cat Hill, a prominent feature and vantage point to view the entire lake area.

In recent times, the increased soil salination has made the area unsuitable for grazing.  Today the lake is mainly used for aquatic recreation.  Despite the extreme salinity of the lake, it provides a habitat for many varieties of water birds, and since 1963 has been protected by the Dumbleyung Lake Nature Reserve.

The lake is recognised as a DIWA wetland as it is a drought refuge for waterbirds and a moulting area for the Australian shelduck. It is one of the five sites in the Avon-Wheatbelt area.

See also

 List of lakes of Western Australia

References 

Lakes of the Great Southern (Western Australia)
Nature reserves in Western Australia
DIWA-listed wetlands
Dumbleyung, Lake